Mary Banks may refer to:

Mary MacLeod Banks (1861–1951), Scottish folklorist
Mary Ross Banks, American litterateur and author
Mary Bankes ( 1598–1661), English Royalist during the English Civil War